Hasanabad-e Sar Tappeh (also Romanized as Ḩasanābād-e Sar Tappeh; also known as Ḩasanābād) is a village in Mazul Rural District, in the Central District of Nishapur County, Razavi Khorasan Province, Iran. At the 2006 census, its population was 169, in 48 families.

References 

Populated places in Nishapur County